The 2016 FIBA Under-17 World Championship for Women (Spanish:Campeonato Mundial FIBA Sub-17 Femenino 2016) was an international basketball competition that was held in Zaragoza, Spain from 22 June 22 to 2 July 2016. It was the fourth edition of the FIBA Under-17 World Championship for Women. Sixteen national teams competed in the tournament.

Australia won its first gold medal in this event by beating Italy, 62–38. In the semifinals, Australia beat the United States 73–60, handing the Americans their first ever loss in the history of the Under-17 World Championships. The United States would go on to win bronze.

Teams
Sixteen teams have qualified for this year's edition.

2015 FIBA Africa Under-16 Championship for Women

2015 FIBA Asia Under-16 Championship for Women

2015 FIBA Americas Under-16 Championship for Women

2015 FIBA Europe Under-16 Championship for Women 

2015 FIBA Oceania Under-16 Championship for Women

Host country

Spain finished fourth at the 2015 FIBA Europe Under-16 Championship for Women. By virtue of hosting this year's FIBA Under-17 World Championship for Women, their European slot was given to the sixth-placed team, France.

Preliminary round
The draw was held on 13 April 2016.

All times are local (UTC+2).

Group A

Group B

Group C

Group D

Final round

Round of 16

9–15th classification

9–15th place quarterfinals

13–15th place semifinal

13th place game

9–12th place semifinals

Eleventh place game

Ninth place game

Quarterfinals

5–8th classification

5–8th place semifinals

Seventh place game

Fifth place game

Semifinals

Third place game

Final

Final standings

Awards 

All-Tournament Team

 PG –  Monique Conti
 SG –  Jasmine Simmons
 SF –  Eziyoda Magbegor
 PF –  Sara Madera
 C –  Han Xu

Statistics

Points

Rebounds

Assists

Blocks

Steals

Efficiency

References

External links
Official website

2016
2016 in women's basketball
2015–16 in Spanish women's basketball
International women's basketball competitions hosted by Spain
International youth basketball competitions hosted by Spain
Sport in Zaragoza
FIBA Under-17 World Championship for Women
FIBA Under-17 World Championship for Women
2016 in youth sport